WJFM (88.5 FM) is a radio station broadcasting a Christian radio format. Licensed to Baton Rouge, Louisiana, United States, the station is currently owned by Jimmy Swaggart Ministries.   The listener-supported station is run by SonLife Radio, a ministry of Jimmy Swaggart Ministries.

Its programming is also broadcast full-time on co-owned KCKR (91.1 FM) serving  Lafayette, Louisiana, WQUA (102.1 FM) serving the Mobile Alabama area; WJYM (730 AM) serving Bowling Green/Toledo, Ohio area; and WFFL (91.7 FM) serving Panama City, Florida; and WGSG (89.5 FM) serving Lake City, Florida.  SonLife Radio is also broadcast full-time on a growing network of broadcast translators around the U.S., mostly in the south and west.

The station has been programming this format since 1995, and offers programming from the Family Worship Center and Jimmy Swaggart Ministries.

History
For nearly 30 years (1962–1992), The WJFM calls were assigned to Western Michigan's 320,000-watt powerhouse FM station 93.7FM.  However, when the station was sold and switched formats, the WJFM calls were dropped and changed to WBCT.

Translators
In addition to the main station, WJFM is relayed by an additional 36 translators nationwide:

References

External links

Christian radio stations in Louisiana
Radio stations established in 1995
1995 establishments in Louisiana